This page details the match results and statistics of the South Africa national football team from 1947 to 1955.

Results
South Africa's score is shown first in each case.

References

South Africa national soccer team results